The Tales of Kanglei Throne is a book by Linthoi Chanu. It is published by the Blue Rose Publisher in December 2017. It deals with the mythological and historical events of Kangleipak (Manipur) from the prehistoric times upto the seventh century.
The Kanglei realm (Kangleipak), an antique name of Manipur, emerged as a well established kingdom in the year 33 C.E. Two historical personalities, "Chingkhong Poireiton" and "Nongda Lairen Pakhangba" founded the civilization of Ancient Kangleipak, whose main feature was the ideological system of kingship and royalty, having Nongda Lairen Pakhangba as the first king to sit on the throne of Kangleipak (lit. Kanglei realm).

Background 
Linthoi Chanu's The Tales of Kanglei Throne has stories which are from the following ancient texts:

Contents 
The Tales of Kanglei Throne contains 4 chapters.

See also 
 And That Is Why . . . Manipuri Myths Retold

Notes

References

External links 
 

2017 books
Asian mythology
Books about literary theory
History of Manipur
Meitei culture
Meitei folklore in popular culture
Meitei mythology in popular culture
Mythology books